38 Special may refer to:
 .38 Special, a revolver cartridge 
 38 Special (band), an American rock band
 38 Special (album), an album from the 38 Special band